WPAE is a Christian radio station licensed to Centreville, Mississippi, broadcasting on 89.7 MHz FM.  WPAE serves the areas of Baton Rouge, Louisiana and Natchez, Mississippi, and is owned by Port Allen Educational Broadcasting Foundation.

WPAE airs a variety of Christian Talk and Teaching programs as well as  southern gospel music. Programs heard on WPAE include; Grace to You with John MacArthur, Revive our Hearts with Nancy Leigh DeMoss, The Alternative with Tony Evans, In Touch with Charles Stanley, Insight for Living with Chuck Swindoll, and Joni and Friends.

References

External links
WPAE's official website

PAE
Moody Radio affiliate stations